First Grand Constitution and Bylaws is the debut studio album by American experimental rock band Secret Chiefs 3, released on September 30, 1996 by Amarillo Records.

Release history 

In 2000 Web of Mimicry remastered and reissued the album on CD bonus tracks "Emir of the Bees". In 2011, French label !Angrr! issued the release with a further bonus track on vinyl.

Critical reception 

AllMusic praised the album, noting that "the trio somehow [manage] to concoct even more mysterious and demented compositions than Mr. Bungle".

Track listing

Personnel 
Adapted from the First Grand Constitution and Bylaws liner notes.

Secret Chiefs 3
 Trevor Dunn – bass guitar, vocals 
 Danny Heifetz – drums, trombone, percussion
 Trey Spruance – electric guitar, organ, synthesizer, sampler, tape, bass guitar , vocals , recording, mixing, editing, illustrations, art direction

Additional musicians
 Kris Hendrickson – backing vocals 
 Clinton "Bär" McKinnon – saxophone , bass guitar 

Production and design
 Billy Anderson – recording and mixing 
 Mike Bogus – additional engineering
 Mike Johnson – editing
 Mari Kono – photography
 Margaret Murray – design
 Marc Orten – additional engineering
 Guy Slater – mastering
 Gregg Turkington – executive production

Release history

References

External links 
 

1996 albums
Secret Chiefs 3 albums
Web of Mimicry albums
Albums produced by Trey Spruance
Amarillo Records albums